Mornay Visser (born 30 March 1969) is a South African former rugby union player.

Playing career
Visser matriculated at Paarl Gimnasium and represented  at the annual Craven Week tournaments in 1987 and 1988, captaining the team in 1988 and gained selection for the 1988 South African Schools team. In 1990, he enrolled at the University of Stellenbosch and represented Maties on the rugby field. Visser played one  test match for the Springboks, the pre World Cup test against  at Ellis Park, in 1995.

Test history

See also
List of South Africa national rugby union players – Springbok no. 625

References

1969 births
Living people
South African rugby union players
South Africa international rugby union players
Western Province (rugby union) players
Sharks (Currie Cup) players
Sharks (rugby union) players
Alumni of Paarl Gimnasium
Rugby union hookers
Rugby union players from Cape Town